Niccolò "Nico" Mannion (born March 14, 2001) is an Italian-American professional basketball player for Virtus Bologna of the Italian Lega Basket Serie A (LBA) and the EuroLeague. He played college basketball for the Arizona Wildcats. He attended Pinnacle High School in Phoenix, Arizona, where he was a consensus five-star recruit and one of the top point guards in the 2019 class. Although he mainly grew up in the United States, Mannion represents his birth country of Italy in international competitions.

Early life
Mannion was born in Siena, Tuscany, Italy, to former NBA player Pace Mannion and Gaia Bianchi. There, he spent his early childhood before his family moved to Salt Lake City, Utah, and finally settled in Phoenix, Arizona.

High school career
As a freshman, Mannion began playing basketball for Pinnacle High School in Phoenix, Arizona under head coach Charlie Wilde. On February 9, 2017, he featured in a Sports Illustrated article, "A 15-Year-Old (Sorta-Maybe) Basketball Prodigy". Mannion started in all 28 of his games, averaging 20.2 points, 4.6 rebounds, 4.7 assists, and 2.4 steals per game while leading Pinnacle to a 22–6 record. He was named MaxPreps first team All-American and Arizona Republic Class 6A first team All-State. Entering his sophomore season, Mannion was named to the USA Today All-USA Arizona preseason team. He missed his first four games with a broken left hand. On February 28, 2018, Mannion scored 21 points in a 76–60 win over Mountain Pointe High School for the Class 6A state championship. He finished the season averaging 23.4 points, 4.7 rebounds, and 5.8 assists per game, leading Pinnacle to a 24–7 record. Mannion received MaxPreps Sophomore All-American third team and Arizona Gatorade Player of the Year distinction.

He took online summer courses to be able to graduate in the following spring. On December 1, Mannion scored 37 points, including the game-winning three-pointer, in an 82–80 victory over Shadow Mountain High School, who had won 73 straight games against Arizona opponents. MaxPreps writer Jordan Divens said that Mannion's performance in the game "will go down in Arizona high school basketball lore." Five days later, Mannion recorded 76 points and 12 assists in a nationally televised game against top recruit Jalen Green and San Joaquin Memorial High School at the Hoophall West Invitational. On December 30, he scored 45 points in an 88–78 loss to Mater Dei High School at the Rancho Mirage Holiday Invitational National Division championship. Mannion, on February 2, 2019, tallied 57 points, including the game-winning shot as time expired, to help defeat Chaparral High School. On February 27, he led Pinnacle to a second Class 6A state title, posting 56 points, eight rebounds, and six assists in an 83–64 win over Chaparral High School. By the end of the season, Mannion was averaging 43.4 points, 6.2 rebounds, and 6.2 assists per game. He reclaimed the Arizona Gatorade Player of the Year award and was recognized as National High School Coaches Association (NHSCA) Senior Athlete of the Year. Mannion also earned USA Today All-USA second team and Naismith All-American third team honors. In the spring, he played in the McDonald's All-American Game and Nike Hoop Summit.

Recruiting
Mannion was considered the top player in the 2020 recruiting class by 247Sports, Rivals and ESPN. But he reclassified to the 2019 class. Mannion received his first college basketball offer from Cal State Northridge while in eighth grade. In high school, he picked up offers from several major NCAA Division I programs, including Duke and Villanova. Mannion was a consensus five-star recruit and the best recruit from Arizona in the 2019 class. On September 14, 2018, he committed to Arizona over Marquette.

College career
Mannion earned preseason first-team All-Pac-12 Conference honors and was named to the preseason watch lists for the Wooden Award and Naismith Trophy. In his second collegiate game for Arizona, on November 6, 2019, he recorded 23 points, nine assists and four rebounds in a 90–69 win over Illinois. On November 28, Mannion posted 16 points and 11 assists and made a game-winning layup with four seconds left in a 93–91 victory over Pepperdine in the first round of the Wooden Legacy. In a second round win over Penn, he scored a season-high 24 points. Mannion led his team to the Wooden Legacy title and was named tournament most valuable player (MVP) after averaging 16.3 points and 7.3 assists per game. In the following day, he earned Pac-12 freshman of the week accolades. On February 29, 2020, Mannion had 19 points and six assists in a 69–64 loss to UCLA. At the conclusion of the regular season, Mannion was named to the All-Pac-12 second team and the All-Freshman Team. Mannion averaged 14.0 points and 5.3 assists per game as a freshman. Following the season, he declared for the 2020 NBA draft.

Professional career

Golden State Warriors (2020–2021)
Mannion was selected with the 48th overall pick by the Golden State Warriors in the 2020 NBA draft hosted on November 18, 2020.

Virtus Bologna (2021–present)
On August 10, 2021, Mannion signed a two-year contract with Italian club Virtus Bologna of the Lega Basket Serie A, a team with the ambition of winning the EuroCup and qualify to the EuroLeague. The deal was closed in 24 hours after the end of the free agency. After having ousted Lietkabelis, Ulm and Valencia in the first three rounds of the playoffs, on 11 May 2022, Virtus defeated Frutti Extra Bursaspor by 80–67 at the Segafredo Arena, winning its first EuroCup and qualifying for the EuroLeague after 14 years.  However, despite having ended the regular season at the first place and having ousted 3–0 both Pesaro and Tortona in the first two rounds of playoffs, Virtus was defeated 4–2 in the national finals by Olimpia Milano.

On 29 September 2022, after having ousted Milano in the semifinals, Virtus won its third Supercup, defeating 72–69 Banco di Sardegna Sassari and achieving a back-to-back, following the 2021 trophy.

National team career
Mannion holds dual citizenship to the United States and Italy; his father is American from Salt Lake City, while his mother is Italian from Guidonia Montecelio. In 2017, he joined training camp with the United States national under-16 team and was a finalist for its 2017 FIBA Under-16 Americas Championship roster. After not making the team, he was contacted by the Italian Basketball Federation and joined the Italian national under-16 team at the 2017 FIBA Europe Under-16 Championship in Podgorica, Montenegro. Mannion made his debut on August 11, 2017, recording 15 points and seven assists in a 64–59 loss to France. Two days later, he posted 42 points, five rebounds, and six steals in 29 minutes in an 86–57 victory over Russia. Through seven games, Mannion averaged a tournament-high 19.9 points, 5.7 rebounds, 4.0 assists, and 3.0 steals per game, leading Italy to a ninth-place finish.

He debuted for the senior Italian national team at European qualifiers for the 2019 FIBA World Cup. In his sole appearance on July 1, 2018, Mannion scored nine points in 29 minutes in an 81–66 loss to the Netherlands, becoming the fourth-youngest player in team history at age 17.

International statistics

Career statistics

NBA

Regular season

|-
| style="text-align:left;"|
| style="text-align:left;"|Golden State
| 30 || 1 || 12.1 || .342 || .367 || .821 || 1.5 || 2.3 || .5 || .0 || 4.1
|- class="sortbottom"
| style="text-align:center;" colspan="2"|Career
| 30 || 1 || 12.1 || .342 || .367 || .821 || 1.5 || 2.3 || .5 || .0 || 4.1

College

|-
| style="text-align:left;"| 2019–20
| style="text-align:left;"| Arizona
| 32 || 32 || 32.3 || .392 || .327 || .797 || 2.5 || 5.3 || 1.2 || .0 || 14.0

Personal life
Mannion is the son of an American father and an Italian mother. His father, Pace Mannion, is a former National Basketball Association (NBA) player who played for six NBA teams through the 1980s. He played professionally for various teams in Italy until his retirement in 2002. Most notably, he helped Italian club Pallacanestro Cantù win the 1991 FIBA Korać Cup. Mannion's mother, Gaia Bianchi, is a former volleyball player who played for the Italian national volleyball team. In high school, one of Mannion's teammates was current South Carolina Gamecocks quarterback Spencer Rattler. They helped lead Pinnacle High School to a state championship in 2017-18.

References

External links

Arizona Wildcats bio
USA Basketball bio

2001 births
Living people
American men's basketball players
American people of Italian descent
Arizona Wildcats men's basketball players
Basketball players at the 2020 Summer Olympics
Basketball players from Phoenix, Arizona
Golden State Warriors draft picks
Golden State Warriors players
Italian men's basketball players
Italian people of American descent
McDonald's High School All-Americans
National Basketball Association players from Italy
Olympic basketball players of Italy
Point guards
Santa Cruz Warriors players
Sportspeople from Siena
United States men's national basketball team players
Virtus Bologna players